Michael Patrick Ramirez (born May 11, 1961) is an American cartoonist for the Las Vegas Review-Journal. His cartoons present mostly conservative viewpoints. He is a two-time Pulitzer Prize winner.

Early life and education
Ramirez was born in Tokyo, Japan, to a Mexican-American father and Japanese-American mother. He graduated from the University of California, Irvine in 1984 with a bachelor's degree. He worked for The Commercial Appeal of Memphis for seven years and then for the Los Angeles Times. In 1994, he was awarded the Pulitzer Prize for Editorial Cartooning. He again won the Pulitzer for editorial cartooning in 2008. He is a three-time winner of the Society of Professional Journalists' Sigma Delta Chi Award for excellence in journalism in 1995, 1997 and 2007. In 1996, he was given the Mencken Award for Best Editorial Cartoon. He is a regular contributor to USA Today and The Weekly Standard, and his work has a subscription/distribution of over five hundred and fifty newspapers and magazines through Creators Syndicate. He was also the co-editor of the Investor's Business Daily editorial page. In 2018, he joined the Las Vegas Review-Journal.

Career
Ramirez initially planned to study medicine in college and considered journalism a hobby. He became seriously interested in that field when his first cartoon for the college newspaper, lampooning candidates for student office, had the student assembly demanding an apology.

Ramirez was a regular guest on The NewsHour with Jim Lehrer. He has been on CNN, CNN International, Fox News Sunday, BBC Television, BBC Radio, NPR, and The Michael Reagan Show. His cartoons have been featured on CNN, Fox News, The O'Reilly Factor, and The Rush Limbaugh Show. His work has been published in such publications as The New York Times, The Washington Post, The New York Post, Time Magazine, Politico, National Review and U.S. News & World Report.

He is the author of two books, Everyone Has the Right to My Opinion and Give Me Liberty or Give Me Obamacare.

Cartoon controversies
In October 2000, the Los Angeles Times published a Ramirez cartoon that appeared to depict a Jewish man worshiping the word "Hate" embedded into the Western Wall. According to the  Times Associate Editor Narda Zacchino ombudsman, this provoked an "unprecedented" negative reaction. Ramirez denied singling out Jews, claiming that the wall in the cartoon was not meant to suggest the Western Wall, and that while there was a Jew worshiping at the hate wall, there was also a figure bowing before it wearing a kaffiyeh (though it is difficult to see).

In July 2003, the Los Angeles Times published a Sunday editorial cartoon by Ramirez that depicted a man pointing a gun at President Bush's head; it was a takeoff on the 1969 Pulitzer Prize-winning photo by Eddie Adams that showed Vietnamese general Nguyễn Ngọc Loan executing a Viet Cong prisoner at point-blank range. The cartoon prompted a visit from the Secret Service, but no charges were filed.

In September 2007, the Columbus Dispatch published a Ramirez cartoon depicting Iran as a sewer (labeled with the word "extremism"), with cockroaches spreading from it over Iraq, Afghanistan, and other countries of the Middle East. Some commentators compared this with characterizations both of Jews in pre-Holocaust Germany and Rwandan Tutsis before the 1994 genocide.

In July 2013, Investor's Business Daily published a Ramirez cartoon that depicted lynching in its criticism of Al Sharpton.

In October 2013, Investor's Business Daily published a Ramirez cartoon that drew a parallel between the problems of the Affordable Care Act web site debut and the Space Shuttle Challenger disaster, to which many critics objected.

Syndication
Ramirez's cartoons were carried in the Los Angeles Times until the end of 2005. Investor's Business Daily carried his cartoons from 2006 until the end of its run as a daily newspaper in 2016.

Awards
 1994: Pulitzer Prize for Editorial Cartooning
 1995: Sigma Delta Chi Award for Editorial Cartooning
 1996: Mencken Award for Editorial Cartooning, presented by Free Press Association
 1997: UCI Medal, University of California, Irvine
 1997: Sigma Delta Chi Award for Editorial Cartooning
 2004: Lincoln Fellow, Claremont Institute
 2005: Scripps Howard Foundation, National Journalism Award for Editorial Cartooning
 2006: National Cartoonist Society Division Award for Editorial Cartooning
 2007: Sigma Delta Chi Award for Editorial Cartooning
 2008: National Cartoonist Society Division Award for Editorial Cartooning
 2008: Pulitzer Prize for Editorial Cartooning
 2008: Fischetti Award for Editorial Cartooning
 2011: National Cartoonist Society Division Award for Editorial Cartooning
 2013: National Cartoonist Society Division Award for Editorial Cartooning
 2014: National Cartoonist Society Division Award for Editorial Cartooning
 2015: National Cartoonist Society The Reuben Award
2018: Benjamin Harrison Presidential Site Advancing American Democracy Award
 Honorary Member of Pi Sigma Alpha, National Political Honor Society

References

External links
 Michael P. Ramirez website
 

1961 births
Living people
American editorial cartoonists
People from Tokyo
Pulitzer Prize for Editorial Cartooning winners
University of California, Irvine alumni
Los Angeles Times people
American people of Mexican descent
American people of Japanese descent